SM U-41 or U-XLI was a U-27 class U-boat or submarine for the Austro-Hungarian Navy. U-41, built by the Austrian firm of Cantiere Navale Triestino (CNT) at the Pola Navy Yard, was launched in November 1917. When she was commissioned in February 1918, she became the last boat of her class to enter service. She was also the last domestically constructed Austro-Hungarian U-boat to enter service.

She displaced  when surfaced and over  when submerged. She was armed with two bow torpedo tubes and could carry a load of up to four torpedoes. She was also equipped with a  deck gun and a machine gun.

U-41 was at Cattaro at war's end, and was ceded to France as a war reparation in 1920. She was towed to Bizerta and broken up within a year.

Design and construction 

Once these steps had alleviated their most urgent needs, the Austro-Hungarian Navy selected the German Type UB II design for its newest submarines in mid 1915. The Germans were reluctant to allocate any of their wartime resources to Austro-Hungarian construction, but were willing to sell plans for up to six of the UB II boats to be constructed under license in Austria-Hungary. The Navy agreed to the proposal and purchased the plans from AG Weser of Bremen, one of the two German shipyards building UB II submarines.

U-41 displaced  surfaced and  submerged. She was capable of  while surfaced and  while submerged. U-27-class boats were designed for a crew of 23–24.

U-41 was armed with two  bow torpedo tubes and could carry a complement of four torpedoes. She was also equipped with a 75 mm/26 (3.0 in) deck gun and an  machine gun.

She was laid down on 23 February 1917 at the Pola Navy Yard. U-41 was launched on 11 November.

Service career 
On 19 February 1918, SM U-41 was commissioned into the Austro-Hungarian Navy under the command of Linienschiffsleutnant Edgar Wolf. When she entered service, U-41 was the last boat of her class to do so. She was also the last domestically constructed U-boat completed and commissioned into the Austro-Hungarian Navy.
Wolf and U-41 departed Pola on 17 March for a patrol in the Mediterranean. On 30 March, Wolf attempted to torpedo a steamer off the coast of Africa, but missed his target. Three days later, the left diesel engine failed and Wolf steered his boat back to port, arriving at Cattaro on 5 April. U-41 sailed for Pola on 9 April and, completing the journey two days later, underwent repairs over the next six weeks. She returned to Pola and underwent more extensive repairs, remaining there until August.

After making way to the submarine base at Brioni, U-41 set out on another patrol into the Mediterranean on 29 August, but put into Šibenik the next day for engine repairs. Resuming her patrol after a day's delay, U-41 reached her patrol area east of Malta. Wolf and U-41 scored their first success on 13 September, when they torpedoed and sank the steamer Amiral Charner west of Pantellaria. The  French ship was carrying horses and a general cargo from Marseilles for Salonika when she was attacked. Six were killed in the attack on the French ship. On 26 September, U-41 attacked another steamer west of Kefalonia, but was apparently unsuccessful. U-41 ended her patrol at Cattaro on 28 September.

On October 6, Wolf and U-41 set out from Cattaro to patrol off Durazzo and the Albanian coast. After nine days without success, the boat returned to Cattaro, and remained there through the end of the war. On 1 November, U-41 was taken over by a British commission, who controlled the vessel until she was ceded to France as a war reparation in 1920. U-29 foundered en route, but U-31 and U-41 reached their destination and were scrapped within the next year.

Summary of raiding history

Notes

References

Bibliography 

 
 
 
 
 

U-27-class submarines (Austria-Hungary)
U-boats commissioned in 1918
1917 ships
World War I submarines of Austria-Hungary
Ships built in Pola